Erminie Cohen  (née Bernstein; July 23, 1926 – February 15, 2019) was a Canadian politician who served in the Senate from 1993 to 2001.

Biography

Born Erminie Joy Bernstein in Saint John, New Brunswick, she graduated from Mount Allison University. In the 1970s, she co-founded Saint John Women for Action. She was a founding member of the Board of Hestia House, a trustee of Saint Joseph's Hospital, member of the Human Development Council, and Chair of Opera New Brunswick. She was the Chair of the New Brunswick Adoption Foundation Board, and President of the Foundation (Saint John) up until her death.

She was appointed on the recommendation of Prime Minister Brian Mulroney to the Senate of Canada in 1993 representing the senatorial division of Saint John, New Brunswick. She was a member of the Progressive Conservative Party caucus until her retirement in 2001, where she continued her devotion to social causes in particular, poverty. This included acting as the co-chair of the Progressive Conservative National Caucus Task Force on Poverty, and spearheading attempts to make discrimination based on social condition prohibited under the Canadian Human Rights Act.

Her awards include a Doctorate of Laws from the University of New Brunswick in Saint John, the Humanitarian Service Award from the Salvation Army, the Red Cross Humanitarian Award, and was also honoured by the Rotary Club as a Paul Harris Fellow. She was awarded an honorary doctorate of laws degree from the University of New Brunswick.

Personal life and death
In 1948, she married Edgar R. Cohen. Together with her husband, she operated a women's fashion store and various real estate developments. She had three children: Shelley, Lee and Cathy.

She died on February 15, 2019, at the Saint John Regional Hospital.

References

External links

1926 births
2019 deaths
Canadian senators from New Brunswick
Women members of the Senate of Canada
Jewish Canadian politicians
Members of the Order of Canada
Politicians from Saint John, New Brunswick
Progressive Conservative Party of Canada senators
Women in New Brunswick politics
21st-century Canadian politicians
21st-century Canadian women politicians
Jewish women politicians